1927 is a British theatre company, based in Margate, Kent, England. It produces and performs mixed-media live animation theatre.

History
Inspired by a love of silent film and animation, 1927 was established in 2005 by animator and illustrator Paul Barritt and writer and performer Suzanne Andrade, together with performer Esme Appleton, composer and pianist Lillian Henley, and producer Jo Crowley. Its productions combine performance, live music, animation, and film.

1927's first production was Between the Devil and the Deep Blue Sea at the Battersea Arts Centre in London and the Edinburgh Fringe in 2007. At the Edinburgh Fringe it won a Scotsman Fringe First Award, the Herald Angel Award, the Total Theatre Award for Best Emerging Company, and the Carol Tambor Best of Edinburgh Award. 

1927 is the trading name of 1927 Productions Limited.

Productions

Between the Devil and the Deep Blue Sea (2007).
The Animals & Children Took to the Streets (2010), first performed at the Sydney Opera House.
The Magic Flute (2012), first performed at the Komische Oper, Berlin.  The Magic Flute was a re-imagining of Mozart's comedy, written in collaboration with Barrie Kosky, Artistic Director of the Komische Oper Berlin.
Golem (2014), first performed at the Harrogate Theatre.
Petrushka & L'enfant et les sortilèges (2017) first performed at the Komische Oper, Berlin. Petrushka & L'enfant et les sortilèges is a large-scale double bill of Stravinsky’s ballet Petruskha and Ravel's opera L'enfant et les sortilèges.
Roots (2019) first performed at the Spoleto Festival USA, Charleston, South Carolina.

Audio
Decameron Nights, an audio performance based on the stage show Roots, broadcast on BBC Radio 3 (2020). The name Decameron Nights refers to Giovanni Boccaccio's The Decameron, written in response to the Black Death of 1348.

References

2005 establishments in England
Theatre companies in England
Theatre companies in London